Lasallia pustulata is a species of lichen in the Umbilicariaceae family of fungi. It is the type species of its genus Lasallia.

References

External links

 

Umbilicariales
Lichen species
Lichens described in 1753
Taxa named by Carl Linnaeus